Sweetwater (released as Sweet Vengeance in the UK, Australia and New Zealand) is a 2013 American Western film directed by Logan Miller and co-written with Andrew McKenzie and Noah Miller. The film stars Ed Harris, January Jones, Jason Isaacs, Eduardo Noriega, Stephen Root and Jason Aldean.

Plot 
In the late 1800s, a beautiful ex-prostitute (January Jones) is trying to build an honest life with her husband Miguel in the rugged plains of New Mexico. When she catches the eye of a sadistic leader of a religious sect, Prophet Josiah (Jason Isaacs), her life is violently turned upside down. She embarks upon a course of bloody vengeance with the assistance of eccentric Sheriff Cornelius Jackson (Ed Harris) who has his own violent tendencies.

Cast 
 Ed Harris as Sheriff Cornelius Jackson
 January Jones as Sarah Ramírez
 Jason Isaacs as Prophet Josiah
 Eduardo Noriega as Miguel Ramirez
 Stephen Root as Hugh
 Jason Aldean as Daniel
 Amy Madigan as Madame Bovary
 Vic Browder as Martin
 Luce Rains as Kingfisher
 Dylan Kenin as Jim
 Keith Meriweather as Jonathan
 Noah Miller as Levi
 J.B. Tuttle as Curly
 Chad Brummett as Sid
 Logan Miller as Jacob
 Kevin Wiggins as Barley

References

External links 
 
 
 Sinopsis

2013 films
2010s English-language films
Films shot in New Mexico
2010s thriller films
2013 Western (genre) films
American thriller films
American Western (genre) films
2010s American films